Wanganui Park Secondary College was a Government secondary college with about 1,300 students from years 7 to 12 in Shepparton, Victoria.

The school
The school had approximately 1,300 students, 300 of which are assumed to graduate successfully. The school had an innovative curriculum, with the most notable feature being its Modular Grouping (VMG) system and also offered 2 other levels - Year 7, and the VCE. One of the school's teachers received a state award for innovative teaching in 2008. The school received a federal grant for a literacy and numeracy program. A new, innovative program called "Learning to Learn" was implemented in 2009.

Football team
The school's Australian rules football team competed in the regional MCC Herald Sun Country Shield tournament for several years.

Notable students
 Steele Sidebottom – AFL player (2009 – present)
 Brett Lancaster – Racing Cyclist
 Adam Thompson – lead vocals in Chocolate Starfish (1993 – present)
 Adam Briggs – rapper and writer
 Grant Thompson - Entrepreneur and rapper.

See also
 List of high schools in Victoria
 List of schools in Victoria

References

External links
 

Public high schools in Victoria (Australia)
Shepparton